was a town located in Kitakuwada District, Kyoto Prefecture, Japan. The town was the second largest among the towns and villages in the Kyoto Prefecture. The town was entirely on the Tamba plateau. The town, being surrounded by mountains, had an inland climate with cool summers, cold winters, and a huge amount of precipitation.

As 90% of the area was covered in forest, forestry has been a key industry in Keihoku. The construction of Heian-kyō, capital of Imperial Japan from 794 to 1868, relied hugely on the timber imports from Keihoku. Local villagers and lumberjacks used to deliver the timber to Kyoto through Katsura River during the ancient times.

As of 2003, the town had an estimated population of 6,362 and a density of 29.23 persons per km2. The total area was 217.68 km2. It was said that more artisans are moving to Keihoku in pursue of better quality of life.

On April 1, 2005, Keihoku was merged into the expanded city of Kyoto, specifically at Ukyo Ward, and thus is no longer an independent municipality.

Tourism and transportation
ROOTS Journey, a Keihoku-based company is established to promote sustainable tourism within the region. Other than its rich historic background and forestry industry, the region is notable for its "satoyama" lifestyle, traditional thatched roof houses and natural landscapes.

Public transportation
West JR Bus Ser　Kyotsuru Line (Kyoto Station - Nijo Station -Kaohsiung-Tsumenoo- Zhouyama) 
Miyama-Keihoku Bus 
Local Furusato bus

National highways
Japan National Route 162 (Zhoushan Highway)
Japan National Route 477

Take JR bus of Takao/Keihoku Line from Kyoto station (terminal No.3) via Omiya, Nijo and Enmachi station. Shuzan terminal is a final stop and it takes around 1 hour 30 mins from Kyoto station. Transport fare costs 1200 yen, or you can use Japan Rail Pass.

Attractions
Josho Emperor Temple
Shuzan Castle ruins
Fukutokuji Temple
Yamakuni Shrine
Zhoushan Abandoned Temple

References

Dissolved municipalities of Kyoto Prefecture